Afonso Cláudio is a municipality in east central Espírito Santo, Brazil, founded in 1963. The town, at a height of 610m above sea level, has a population of approximately 30,455 and an area of 361.7 km2, and a population density of 32,53 inhabitants/km2. Its borders include: (E) Domingos Martins, Santa Maria de Jetibá and Itarana (N) Laranja da Terra and the neighbouring state of Minas Gerais, (W) Brejetuba (S) Conceição do Castelo and Venda Nova do Imigrante.

History
Afonso Cláudio first began to be populated in 1885, when Valentim Perozzini, an Italian immigrant, moved there. Now that place is called São Luis de Miranda. The mainly Italian immigration which took place in this area was indirect, in that people usually first came from the neighbouring localities of Alfredo Chaves, Castelo and Itaguaçu. The name of the municipality was given in honour of Afonso Cláudio de Freitas Rosa (born in Santa Leopoldina, Espírito Santo), the first governor of that state after the implantation of the Brazilian Republic on November 15, 1889.

Climate

References

Municipalities in Espírito Santo